Tara Jaramillo is an American politician, speech language pathologist, and businesswoman serving as a member of the New Mexico House of Representatives for the 38th district. Elected in November 2022, she assumed office on January 1, 2023.

Education 
Jaramillo earned a Bachelor of Arts in special education and Master of Science in speech language pathology from New Mexico State University.

Career 
From 1993 to 1997, Jaramillo worked as a speech language pathologist at La Vida Felicidad Early Intervention in Los Lunas, New Mexico. She worked at Presbyterian Hospital from 1997 to 1999. In 1999, she founded Positive Outcomes, a healthcare organization with over 400 employees. She was elected to the New Mexico House of Representatives in November 2022.

References 

Living people
Democratic Party members of the New Mexico House of Representatives
Women state legislators in New Mexico
New Mexico State University alumni
Businesspeople from New Mexico
21st-century American politicians
21st-century American women politicians
20th-century American businesspeople
20th-century American businesswomen
21st-century American businesspeople
21st-century American businesswomen
Year of birth missing (living people)